The West of the Imagination is a six-part documentary series that aired weekly on PBS from September 22, 1986 to October 27, 1986. The series captured the story of the American "Wild West" as it was told through art, film, photography, music, and entertainers within broader pop culture. Created by Dr. William H. Goetzman and hosted by James Whitmore, The West of the Imagination was produced for PBS by KERA-TV, in association with the Independent Communications Association of Los Angeles and London. Alongside the series, W.W. Norton published a companion book, written by creator William H. Goetzmann.

Series synopsis and episode summaries 
As writer Robert Barr stated in his interview of The West of the Imagination, "the West isn’t simply a spot on the globe, but a place in the mind, a land that has inflamed the imaginations of Americans and of the world." This idea of the Wild West as not only a location and time period but also as a cultural phenomenon is the central focus of exploration in The West of the Imagination. This documentary series fuses a factual account of the real-world history, including segments of historical reenactment, with an exhibition of the different forms of art and media that have stemmed from the events as a result of its cultural influence. Through this deconstruction, The West of the Imagination immortalizes the folklore and myth surrounding the Wild West and its events, capturing the cultural mindset as it has existed and evolved through time.

Episode 1, "The Romantic Horizon," focuses on the Expedition of Lewis and Clarke as seen through the artwork of George Catlin, Karl Bodmer, and Alfred Jacob Miller. 

Episode 2, "The Golden Land," covers the saga of Manifest Destiny and how it influenced the Texas Revolution, the Mexican War, and the gold rush that popularized the journey on the Oregon Trail, as seen through the artwork of George Caleb Bingham, Albert Bierstadt, and Charles Nahl, and the lithographers Currier and Ives. 

Episode 3, "Images of Glory," shows how the artwork of Thomas Moran and Albert Bierstadt and the photography of Eadweard Muybridge, William H. Jackson, and Timothy O'Sullivan captured the American Indian Wars and the Transcontinental Railroad, signifying the beginning of the end of the Wild West as it had previously existed.

Episode 4, "The Wild Riders," analyzes the American Cowboy as a figure, primarily focusing on the two contrasting views of the figure in the art of Frederic Remington and Charles Marion Russell. 

Episode 5, "Play the Legend," covers the Wild West as it is seen in modern popular culture, from the Buffalo Bill's Wild West Show to influences within country musicians and entertainers such as Billy Joe Shaver and Willie Nelson. 

Episode 6, "Enduring Dream," concludes the series with a holistic view of the American Wild West and how its depictions change between the artists who depict it. The episode contrasts the works of white, American artists such as Thomas Hart Benton and Grant Wood with the art of Native American artists Fritz Scholder and T.C. Cannon, the Taos artists' movement, and more, breaking down their differences and similarities and comparing them to the views held today.

Cast list

Critical reception 
The West of Our Imagination was a critical and commercial success. Critics praised its "blending of early artistic visions of the American West" with "up-to-date cinematography of its natural splendors," and it was called "an excellent, cleverly conceived, elegantly photographed series." It was also praised for helping to "distinguish between truth and the fiction depicted by the more romantic artists," and for "answering those questions" about the accuracy of "the mixture of romance and expectation" found within art.

Despite this praise, the series received some criticism for its glossing over of certain issues that perpetuate stereotypes. And, despite intending to remove the mythos from the Wild West, The West of Our Imagination raised comments from several reviewers about potentially "contributing to the myth[s] itself" with historical fiction being infused into the reenactment segments. It was also critiqued for wavering between being "too cute" and making it "too easy for viewers" during some of the reenactment segments, while also "tak[ing] itself too seriously at times" during the short discussion segments at each episodes’ end.

References 

Documentaries about historical events
Western United States in fiction
Wild West shows
PBS original programming
1986 television specials